Nikolai Vladimirovich Nekrasov (18 December 1900 – 4 October 1938) was a Soviet Esperanto writer, translator, and critic.

Biography 

Nekrasov was born in Moscow. A journalist, he worked in the publishing house Moscow worker. He learned Esperanto in 1915.

Esperanto activity, editorial work, and articles 

In 1918–19, he was president of the Tutrusia Ligo de junaj esperantistoj (All-Russia League of Young Esperantists), and editor and typesetter of Juna Mondo (Young World). On 1 June 1922 Nekrasov together with Gregory Demidyuk founded the cultural review La Nova Epoko (The New Epoch), which became one of the organs of SAT. In 1923 he became a member of the Central Committee of Sovetlanda Esperantista Unuiĝo (SEU) (ru: Soyuz Esperantistov Sovetskikh Stran), then under the leadership of Ernest Drezen.

He was especially concerned with the history and criticism of Esperanto literature, the ideology of the proletarian revolutionary Esperanto movement, the nationality problem and cosmoglottics. In La Nova Epoko he published several essays on Esperanto literature (about Baghy, Bulthuis, Jung, Hohlov, Mikhalski, Devkin, Schulhof, and others). His critiques set out mainly from an original sociological viewpoint, but he simultaneously paid much attention to the use of language in the works.

In the early 1930s he actively participated in the compilation and preparation of material on literature for the Enciklopedio de Esperanto. He also published many of Zamenhof's letters.

In 1931 he was one of the cofounders of IAREV (International Association of Revolutionary Esperanto Writers), and edited its first newspaper, La Nova Etapo (The New Stage).

Arrest, execution, and rehabilitation 

Nekrasov was arrested in 1938, and accused of being "an organizer and leader of a fascist, espionage, terrorist organization of Esperantists". For this crime he was shot to death on 4 October 1938. His archive and library were obliterated; presumably many of his unpublished works and translations thus perished.

He was posthumously rehabilitated as innocent on 26 November 1957.

Works

Translated poetry 

Kupra rajdanto (Copper rider) by Pushkin.
Eŭgeno Onegin (Eugene Onegin) by Aleksandr Pushkin, SAT, 1931.
Dekdu (Twelve) and Najtingala ĝardeno (Nightingale garden) by Alexander Blok.
Blanka cigno (White swan) and La mortaj ŝipoj (The dead ships) by Konstantin Bal'mont.
Nubo en pantalono (Cloud in pants) and Suno (Sun) by Vladimir Majakovskij. 
Monna Liza, by Gerasimov.
Socialismo and Patrino (Mother) by Bezimenskij.

Translated prose 

Ruĝa Stelo (The Red Star), by Aleksander Bogdanov, SAT, 1929. (with others)
La Vojo de formiĝo kaj disvastiĝo de la lingvo internacia (The way of formation and spread of the international language), by Ernest Drezen, SAT, 1929
Historio de la mondolingvo (History of the world Language, by Drezen, EKRELO.

Original poetry 

Fablo pri ĝilotinŝraŭbeto (Fabel of a little gelaten-screw), appeared in Sennacieca Revuo
Testamento de Satano (Testament of Satan)
Verda flamo (Green flame)
Krono de sonetoj pri Esperanto (Crown of Sonnets), a commection of poems
Mi moskvano (I, a Muscovite), appeared in Internacia Literaturo

Original prose 

Bibliografio de Esperantaj presaĵoj en USSR dum 12 jaroj de la revolucio 1917-1928, Moscow, 1928 (A bibliography of esperanto material in print in the USSR during the 12 years of the revolution 1917–1928)
Tra USSR per Esperanto (Through the USSR by means of Esperanto)
 Several essays on Esperanto-literaturo in La Nova Epoko  (in Esperanto)

Nekrasov believed that in his original poems he followed the Russian symbolist poets, especially Bryusov, and so he took special care with the purity of his language style. It is known that the largest of his original works was the grand poem "Kazanovo" (en:Casanova) — which according to the impressions of those who read the manuscript, was at a very high level poetically. At least one copy of the manuscript still existed in the beginning of the 1960s, but later disappeared without a trace.

Quotes

"Art is a hammer to beat the world, not a mirror to reflect it."

Works readable on line 
Sennaciismo... burĝa?, from Sennacieca Revuo (Non-national review), 1924

External links 
Nekrasov: Datreveno de talenta poeto (Nekrasov: Anniversary of a talented poet), NikSt, Esperanto, 06.03.91
Nikolaj Nekrasov Soneto pri Espteranto , Esperanta antologio: poemoj 1887–1981 (''Esperanto Anthology: poems 1887–1981) — Rotterdam, 1984, pp. 207–208.

Sources 

The original version of this article is a translation of the corresponding Esperanto language article in Vikipedio.

Notes 

1900 births
1938 deaths
Writers of Esperanto literature
Russian male poets
Translators to Esperanto
Great Purge victims from Russia
Russian critics
Symbolist writers
Russian Esperantists
Soviet rehabilitations
20th-century translators
20th-century Russian poets